Macrocalcara is a genus of moth in the family Gelechiidae.

Species
 Macrocalcara sporima Janse, 1960
 Macrocalcara undina (Meyrick, 1921)

References

Apatetrinae